Díaz is a surname of Spanish origin.

Diaz or Díaz may also refer to:

Places
 Diaz, Arkansas, a city in Jackson County, Arkansas, United States
 Prieto Diaz, a municipality in Sorsogon, Philippines
 Diaz, Tubajon, a barangay in the Philippines
 Armando Diaz, a school in Genoa, Italy, raided by police in 2001

Other uses
 Diaz (musician) (born 1976), Norwegian rapper
 Diaz – Don't Clean Up This Blood, a 2012 film by Daniele Vicari

See also
 
 Dias (surname), the Portuguese equivalent of the surname Díaz
 Díaz-Balart family, a Cuban-American political family